South Providence Library—Providence Community Library is an historic branch library building at 441 Prairie Avenue in Providence, Rhode Island.  The main portion of the building is a single-story brick Colonial Revival structure, designed by Wallis Howe and built in 1930.  Due to the constraints of the lot, Howe's otherwise standard design (used for constructing several other Providence branch libraries) was altered to place the building gable-end to the street.  The street-facing facade has been obscured by a two-level glass-faced modern addition.

The building was listed on the National Register of Historic Places in 1998.

See also
List of libraries in Rhode Island
National Register of Historic Places listings in Providence, Rhode Island
Rochambeau Library-Providence Community Library
Wanskuck Library-Providence Community Library
Smith Hill Library-Providence Community Library
Fox Point Library-Providence Community Library
Mount Pleasant Library-Providence Community Library
Olneyville Library-Providence Community Library
Washington Park Library-Providence Community Library
Knight Memorial Library-Providence Community Library

References

External links
Friends of South Providence Library website
Providence Community Library website

Library buildings completed in 1930
Public libraries in Rhode Island
Libraries on the National Register of Historic Places in Rhode Island
Buildings and structures in Providence, Rhode Island
Education in Providence County, Rhode Island
National Register of Historic Places in Providence, Rhode Island